Teodor Lucuță (2 May 1955 – 11 February 2013) was a Romanian footballer who played for Dinamo București and Petrolul Ploiești as a left-back.

Club career
Teodor Lucuță was born on 2 May 1955 in București, Romania. He was a product of Dinamo București's youth center, winning the national junior title as the team's captain in the 1972–73 season, a season in which he also helped the club's senior team win the Divizia A title by playing five games, making his debut on 10 June 1973 in a 2–0 victory in the derby against Steaua București. He spent a total of 8 seasons with The Red Dogs, helping the club win two more titles, in the first he played 3 games and in the second he appeared in 19 matches, his last Divizia A appearance taking place on 26 April 1980 in a 2–0 loss against FCM Galați, having a total of 128 matches played with one goal scored in the competition and 12 appearances in European competitions, leaving the club to play for Divizia B team, Petrolul Ploiești. Teodor Lucuță died on 11 February 2013 at age 57.

International career
Teodor Lucuță made three appearances for Romania, making his debut on 16 November 1975 under coach Valentin Stănescu in a 2–2 against Spain at the Euro 1976 qualifiers. His following game was a friendly which ended 2–2 against Soviet Union and his third and final appearance for the national team took place on 4 April 1979 in a 2–2 against Spain at the Euro 1980 qualifiers. He also played one game for Romania's Olympic team.

Honours
Dinamo București
Divizia A: 1972–73, 1974–75, 1976–77

Notes

References

External links

1955 births
2013 deaths
Romanian footballers
Romania youth international footballers
Romania under-21 international footballers
Romania international footballers
Association football defenders
Liga I players
Liga II players
FC Dinamo București players
FC Petrolul Ploiești players